Zhuangzi may refer to:
Zhuangzi (book) (莊子), an ancient Chinese collection of anecdotes and fables, one of the foundational texts of Daoism
Zhuang Zhou (莊周), the historical figure known as "Master Zhuang" ("Zhuangzi") and traditional author of the eponymous book